Emanuel Wirth (18 October 18425 January 1923) was a German violinist and violist.

Wirth was born in Žlutice (German: Luditz) in western Bohemia. As Joseph Joachim's assistant at the Hochschule für Musik (Berlin), he taught violin and viola. August Wilhelmj said he was the best violin teacher of his generation. His students included Albert Stoessel, Edmund Severn, and Agnes Tschetschulin.

Wirth played viola in the famous string quartet of its time, the Joachim Quartet. Wirth died in Berlin.

His son Joseph Wirth married Julia Wirth née Stockhausen (1886–1964), daughter of the singer and voice teacher Julius Stockhausen.

1842 births
1923 deaths
People from Žlutice
German Bohemian people
German classical violinists
Male classical violinists
German male violinists
German classical violists
German music educators
19th-century German musicians
19th-century German male musicians